Santiago (previously Aiñiní) is a small town in Los Cabos Municipality in Baja California Sur, Mexico, located on Mexico's Highway 1, about an hour's drive north of San José del Cabo. Like Todos Santos it is almost directly on top of the Tropic of Cancer.

The Misión Santiago de Los Coras in Aiñiní was founded in 1724 by the Jesuit missionary, Ignacio Maria Napoli, and closed in 1795; the subsequent Church of Santiago Apostol was built nearby.

References

 2010 census tables: INEGI

Populated places in Baja California Sur